Red Rock Island (variously known as Moleta, Molate Rock, and Golden Rock) is an uninhabited,  island in the San Francisco Bay located just south of the Richmond–San Rafael Bridge.  The property is the only privately owned island in San Francisco Bay. The boundaries of three counties – San Francisco, Marin, and Contra Costa – converge on the island. The San Francisco County portion is an incorporated part of the city of San Francisco since it is a consolidated city-county; the Contra Costa portion (most of the island) is incorporated inside the city limits of Richmond.

History
Selim E. Woodworth was the first owner and resident of Red Rock Island, where in the 19th century he built a cabin and maintained a hunting preserve.  The island appears, labeled "Molate Island", on an 1850 survey map of the San Francisco Bay area made by Cadwalader Ringgold and an 1854 map of the area by Henry Lange.

The island was once mined for manganese. It was privately purchased in the 1920s.  After a series of owners, David Glickman, at the time a San Francisco attorney and part-time real estate buyer, purchased the island in 1964 for US$49,500.

In the 1980s, a plan was proposed (but never implemented) to remove the top half of the island (which would be sold for highway roadbed construction).  The island would then be developed with a 10-story hotel and casino, and a yacht harbor on the lee (north) side.  Water and power would be provided from lines connected to the San Rafael Bridge.

In June 2007, Glickman, now a gem dealer in Thailand, announced that Red Rock Island was for sale for US$10 million. He had previously attempted to sell the island in 2001, including to the California Department of Fish and Game. No conservation groups or agencies have so far expressed interest in buying the island, though some have considered it.

In early 2012, the island was listed with a realtor at a price of US$5 million. , the island was owned by Brock Durning, who refused to say whether it was for sale.

The island is mentioned and described as "Blue Island" in the novel The Circle by Dave Eggers.

See also

 List of islands of California

References

External links
 Flickr.com: Aerial image of Red Rock Island and Richmond Bridge

Islands of San Francisco Bay
Islands of Northern California
Geography of Richmond, California
Islands of Contra Costa County, California
Islands of Marin County, California
Islands of San Francisco
Uninhabited islands of California
Private islands of the United States